
Gmina Łoniów is a rural gmina (administrative district) in Sandomierz County, Świętokrzyskie Voivodeship, in south-central Poland.

Villages
Gmina Łoniów contains the villages and settlements of Bazów, Bogoria, Chodków Nowy, Chodków Stary, Gągolin, Gieraszowice, Jasienica, Jeziory, Kępa Nagnajewska, Królewice, Krowia Góra, Łążek, Łoniów, Łoniów-Kolonia, Otoka, Piaseczno, Przewłoka, Ruszcza-Kolonia, Ruszcza-Płaszczyzna, Skrzypaczowice, Skwirzowa, Sulisławice, Suliszów, Świniary Nowe, Świniary Stare, Trzebiesławice, Wnorów, Wojcieszyce, Wólka Gieraszowska and Zawidza.

Neighbouring gminas
Gmina Łoniów is bordered by the city of Tarnobrzeg and by the gminas of Baranów Sandomierski, Klimontów, Koprzywnica and Osiek.

References

Polish official population figures 2006

Loniow
Sandomierz County